Vampire Junction is a horror novel by Thai writer  S. P. Somtow, published in 1984. It is the first in a series about Timmy Valentine, a 12-year-old rock star who is actually a 2,000-year-old vampire. Unpublished for many years and rejected by over two dozen publishers, the novel uses a novel narrative technique inspired by the rapid intercutting of MTV music videos, and features a high level of the imagery from "splatter" films. Later, the book was published by Berkley/Ace and Tor Books, and has remained in print ever since.

The novel was voted one of the "forty all-time greatest horror books" by the Horror Writers Association. It has currently been reissued by Diplodocus Press. S. P. Somtow has written two sequels to Vampire Junction, Valentine and Vanitas.

References

American vampire novels
1984 American novels
1984 fantasy novels
American horror novels
Fiction by S. P. Somtow
Vampire novels